ŠK Chemes Humenné is a volleyball club based in Humenné, Slovakia, which plays in the Slovak Extraliga. Founded as VK Linda Chemes Humenne in 1996, the club changed its name to Chemes Humenne in 2002. Chemes is the second most successful team in Slovakia.

Slovak volleyball clubs
Sport in Humenné
1996 establishments in Slovakia
Volleyball clubs established in 1996